Manebhanjyang is a rural municipality (gaunpalika) out of seven rural municipality located in Okhaldhunga District of Province No. 1 of Nepal. There are a total of 8 municipalities in Okhaldhunga in which 1 is urban and 7 are rural.

Moli, Baksa, Nepal, Ubu, Nepal, Ketuke, Manebhanjyang, Thakle, Thoksela and Madhavpur which previously were all separate Village development committee merged to form this new local level body. Fulfilling the requirement of the new Constitution of Nepal 2015, Ministry of Federal Affairs and Local Development replaced all old VDCs and Municipalities into 753 new local level body (Municipality).

The rural municipality is divided into total 9 wards and the headquarter of this newly formed rural municipality is situated in Manebhanjyang.

Demographics
At the time of the 2011 Nepal census, Manebhanjyang Rural Municipality had a population of 21,093. Of these, 33.4% spoke Wambule, 33.0% Nepali, 15.3% Magar, 6.3% Tamang, 6.0% Bahing, 2.0% Jerung, 2.0% Rai, 0.9% Newar  and 1.1% other languages as their first language.

In terms of ethnicity/caste, 40.4% were Rai, 16.3% Magar, 9.9% Chhetri, 6.5% Newar, 6.4% Tamang, 6.1% Hill Brahmin, 4.3% Kami, 3.4% Damai/Dholi, 2.0% Bahing and 4.7% others.

In terms of religion, 51.1% were Hindu, 39.3% Kirati, 8.4% Buddhist, 0.9% Christian and 0.3% others.

References

External links
 Official website
 Final District 1-75 Corrected Last for RAJPATRA

Rural municipalities in Koshi Province
Populated places in Okhaldhunga District
Rural municipalities of Nepal established in 2017
Rural municipalities in Okhaldhunga District